Elousa is a genus of moths in the family Erebidae. The genus was erected by Francis Walker in 1858.

Taxonomy
The genus was previously classified in the subtribe Ophiusina of the family Noctuidae or the tribe Ophiusini of the family Erebidae.

Species
Elousa albicans Walker, [1858]
Elousa psegmapteryx Dyar, 1913
Elousa schausi Giacomelli, 1911

Former species
Elousa fraterna Smith, 1899
Elousa mima Harvey, 1876
Elousa minor Smith, 1899

References

Omopterini
Noctuoidea genera